Carrosserie Pourtout was a French coachbuilding company. Founded by Marcel Pourtout in 1925, the firm is best known for its work in the decades prior to World War II, when it created distinctive and prestigious bodies for cars from numerous European manufacturers. Pre-war Pourtout bodies were mainly one-off, bespoke creations, typically aerodynamic and sporting in character. Together with chief coach designer and stylist Georges Paulin from 1933 to 1938, Pourtout pioneered the Paulin invented 'Eclipse' retractable hardtop system on four models of Peugeot, several Lancia Belna's and other car makes.
Among the company's customers was Georges Clemenceau, the physician and journalist who served as the prime minister of France from 1906 to 1909 and 1917 to 1920.

The firm later turned to designs for industry and public transport.

Carrosserie Pourtout ceased its creative operations in 1994 but survives to the present day as a vehicle body repair shop.

Before and during World War II

Marcel Pourtout started in 1925 with a small workshop in Bougival and a workforce of twelve.  His wife Henriette looked after the firm’s finances. Hard work and plentiful orders allowed repayment of Carrosserie Pourtout’s start-up loans in just a few years, and in 1928 the premises were enlarged.

In 1936 Pourtout expanded again, taking over the Hurtu factory workshops in Rueil-Malmaison. Here the staff, which then numbered fifteen, could produce small production runs of coachwork, in addition to the one-offs.

Until World War II, Carrosserie Pourtout's creations were exhibited at the annual Salon de l'Automobile de Paris.

At the beginning of the war, before France fell to the Germans, the firm made ambulances on Chevrolet chassis.

In 1941 Marcel Pourtout was appointed Mayor of Rueil-Malmaison (Hauts-de-Seine) in 1941, as it was customary at the time to choose someone who headed a business. (He held the post until 1944; and again from 1947 to 1971.)

In 1942 the occupying forces requisitioned Pourtout's workshops, partially demolishing them when they left. Also in 1942 the Nazis executed the firm's prewar designer, Georges Paulin (see below), as a member of the French Resistance and an agent of British Intelligence.

Collaboration with Emile Darl'mat and Georges Paulin 

At the end of 1933 Peugeot’s Paris concessionaire Emile Darl'mat introduced Marcel Pourtout to Georges Paulin, a dentist with a flair for coachwork design. He became Pourtout’s lead designer.

Richard Adatto, author of a book on French aerodynamic styling of the era, has been quoted as saying: "Paulin became the leading French stylist of the time...Everything he touched was designed with aerodynamics in mind. He was very conscious of fuel efficiencies and the aerodynamic efficiencies that could be created by the lines of the car. You could go faster, which meant you could put a smaller engine in the car and it could go faster even though it was a small car."

Pourtout, Darl'mat and Paulin collaborated in the creation of the revolutionary Eclipse roof, a design of retractable hardtop that had a special mechanism, patented in Paulin's name, to stow it out of sight in the car’s boot. Carrosserie Pourtout produced Eclipse versions of the Peugeot 301, 401, 402 and 601, the Lancia Belna, and models from Hotchkiss and Panhard.

For the 1937 24 Hours of Le Mans endurance race Carrosserie Pourtout collaborated with Emile Darl'Mat to create the bodies for three identical cars that utilized modified Peugeot 402 engines in modified 302 chassis. In the 1937 race The Darl'mat Roadsters placed 7th, 8th and 10th overall. They returned the following year, and the entry driven by De Cortanze won the under-2 litre class.

In 1937 and 1938 Carrosserie Pourtout made a road-going version of the Le Mans cars, the Peugeot 402 Darl’Mat "Spécial Sport", which had a total production run of 106.

Major prewar works  

DELAGE

LANCIA

PEUGEOT 402 Darl'mat

RENAULT Saprar

After World War II
Notwithstanding the loss of Paulin, Carrosserie Pourtout continued to exhibit at the Salon de l'Automobile from 1947 to 1952, and the firm produced a number of prestigious bodies before Marcel Pourtout and his son Claude turned to projects for industry and advertising.

Altogether, taking into account the firm's work both before and after World War II, Carrosserie Pourtout designed and built bodies on chassis from at least twenty manufacturers, namely: Voisin, Fiat, Hispano-Suiza, Panhard, Hotchkiss, Bugatti, Lorraine, Lancia, Unic, Renault, Peugeot, Bentley, Delage, Delahaye, Buick, Delaunay-Belleville, Talbot-Lago, Healey, Simca and Chrysler.

Gallery of Pourtout-bodied cars

References 

It also incorporates text translated from this French Wikipedia article about Marcel Pourtout as of 2008-07-02

Coachbuilders of France
Vehicle manufacturing companies established in 1925
Design companies established in 1925
French companies established in 1925